The term Curaçao national football team may refer to any of the following:

Association football (soccer)
 Curaçao national football team (1921–1958), the original team of the Colony of Curaçao and Dependencies of the former Curaçao Football Association (CVB); first played in 1924
 Netherlands Antilles national football team, successor of the original Curaçao team formed by the Netherlands Antillean Football Union (NAVU) until its dissolution in 2010
 Curaçao national football team, the current men's team of solely the independent Curaçao by the Curaçao Football Federation (FFK) since 2011
 Curaçao women's national football team, the current women's team since 2011